Ericameria resinosa, the Columbia goldenweed, or Columbia goldenbush, is a North American species of flowering shrubs in the family Asteraceae. It is native to the northwestern part of the United States, in the states of Washington, Oregon, and Idaho.

Ericameria resinosa is a shrub up to 50 cm (20 inches) tall. It has thread-like or narrowly oblanceolate leaves up to 25 mm (1 inch) long, with resinous glands on the surface. Flower heads are white, with 10–15 disc florets and 3–7 ray florets. Its habitats include rocky plains and steep hillsides.

References

External links

resinosa
Flora of the Northwestern United States
Plants described in 1840
Taxa named by Thomas Nuttall
Flora without expected TNC conservation status